Luke Nussbaumer (born 12 February 1989) is a professional cricketer who plays for Guernsey. He played in the 2016 ICC World Cricket League Division Five tournament, taking 8 wickets in 3 matches. In May 2019, he was named in Guernsey's squad for the 2019 T20 Inter-Insular Cup. He made his Twenty20 International (T20I) debut for Guernsey against Jersey on 1 June 2019.

References

External links
  

1989 births
Living people
Guernsey cricketers
Guernsey Twenty20 International cricketers
Place of birth missing (living people)